Uglegorsky is a rural locality (a settlement) in Tatsinsky District of Rostov Oblast, Russia. Population:  It lies 6 km from the railway station Tatsinskaya.

References

Rural localities in Rostov Oblast